Millennium Tower is a mixed-use building in New York City.  With the address of 101 West 67th Street, the building occupies the full block bounded by Broadway, Columbus Avenue, and 67th and 68th Streets. It was erected in 1994 and is one of a trio of buildings by Millennium Partners known collectively as Lincoln Square. The building was designed by James Carpenter.

Millennium Tower contains 305 luxury apartments in addition to retail space and a multi-screen cinema. The apartment section begins on the 44th floor.

References

External links 
Millennium Tower New Construction Manhattan

Kohn Pedersen Fox buildings
Residential skyscrapers in Manhattan
Lincoln Center